Absa Bank Limited (ABL), formerly known as Amalgamated Banks of South Africa, is a commercial bank in South Africa. It is licensed by the Reserve Bank of South Africa, the central bank and national banking regulator.

Location
The bank's headquarters are located on the 7th Floor of Absa Towers West, 15 Troye Street, Johannesburg, South Africa. The geographic coordinates of the bank's headquarters are:
26°12'23.0"S 28°02'57.0"E (Latitude:-26.206389; Longitude:28.049167).

Overview
Absa Bank Limited is one of the largest commercial banks in South Africa. As of 31 December 2018, the bank's total assets were ZAR:1,289,000,000,000 (US$73,691,500,000). Absa Bank Limited Limited is a 100 percent subsidiary of Absa Group Limited, the Pan African financial services conglomerate headquartered in South Africa, with subsidiaries in 12 African countries, whose total assets exceeded US$91 billion as at October 2019. The shares of the stock of Absa Group Limited, are listed on te JSE Limited, where  they trade under the symbol AGL.

History
According to the archives of maintained by Barclays Bank Plc, 
Amalgamated Banks of South Africa Limited was incorporated in 1986, by "the merger of UBS (United Building Society) Holdings, the Allied and Volkskas Groups, and certain interests of the Sage Group". In 1992 Absa acquired the entire shareholding of the Bankorp Group, which included TrustBank, Senbank and Bankfin. The name of the bank's holding company was changed to Absa Group Limited in 1997.

In 2005 Barclays acquired a 62.3 percent majority stake in ABSA, and Barclays' existing subsidiary in South Africa and Barclays Capital's business were subsequently operated under the ABSA brand. Twelve other financial subsidiaries in 11 sub-Saharan African countries were made part of the group. Absa Group changed its name to Barclays Africa Group.

In 2016, Barclays Bank Plc, which owned 62.3 percent of Barclays Africa Group (BAG), the then parent company of Absa Bank Limited (the South African subsidiary), decided to divest its majority shareholding in BAG, worth £3.5 billion at that time.

In 2017 Barclays reduced its shareholding in BAG to 14.9 percent. After that, BAG re-branded to Absa Group Limited in 2018. Under the terms of that re-brand, Absa had until June 2020 to change the names of its subsidiaries in 12 African countries.

Governance
The bank is governed by a seven-person board of directors. The chairperson of the board is Sello Moloko, one of the non-executive directors. The managing director and CEO is Arrie Rautenbach.

See also

 List of banks in South Africa

References

External links
  Official Website

Banks of South Africa
Absa Group Limited
Companies based in Johannesburg
Banks established in 1986
Economy of South Africa
South African companies established in 1986